The 1981 Princeton Tigers football team was an American football team that represented Princeton University during the 1981 NCAA Division I-A football season. Princeton finished third in the Ivy League.

In their fourth year under head coach Frank Navarro, the Tigers compiled a 5–4–1 record but were outscored 323 to 233. Jonathon D. Helmerich and Lawrence D. Van Pelt were the team captains.

Princeton's 5–1–1 conference record placed third in the Ivy League standings. The Tigers outscored Ivy opponents 181 to 155. 

This would be Princeton's last season in the NCAA's top level of football competition. Shortly after the season ended, the NCAA reassigned all of the Ivy League teams to the second-tier Division I-AA, which would later be renamed the Football Championship Subdivision.

Princeton played its home games at Palmer Stadium on the university campus in Princeton, New Jersey.

Schedule

Roster

References

Princeton
Princeton Tigers football seasons
Princeton Tigers football